The Coastal Volcanic Belt (CVB) is a major Late Silurian volcanic belt extending from Massachusetts, United States into southwestern New Brunswick, Canada. It is one of the largest bimodal volcanic provinces in world, ranging from basalts to rhyolites.

See also
Volcanism of Canada
Volcanism of Eastern Canada

External links
Maine's Volcanoes (Yes, Maine) Among World's Biggest

References

Volcanic belts
Geology of Maine
Geology of Massachusetts
Volcanism of New Brunswick
Volcanism of Maine
Volcanism of Massachusetts
Extinct volcanism
Silurian volcanism
Geography of Charlotte County, New Brunswick